The women's heptathlon at the 2017 World Championships in Athletics was held at the Olympic Stadium on .

Summary
With the retirements of Jessica Ennis-Hill and Brianne Theisen-Eaton, Laura Ikauniece-Admidiņa was the only returning medalist from 2015. Since both retirees were also on the Olympic podium, that left Olympic champion Nafissatou Thiam as the clear favorite. She had scored the third best ever heptathlon score in Götzis at the end of May, her 7013 points getting close to the European Record. Ikauniece-Admidina and Carolin Schäfer had also both scored more than 6800 points with 6815 points and 6836 points respectably. Therefore three athletes had surpassed Thiam's winning score from Rio. 
Nevertheless, Thiam's position was emphasized when Ikauniece-Admidiņa was injured in the first event and could not continue. Yorgelis Rodríguez provided surprise competition when she made three personal bests in the high jump to stay only 8 points behind Thiam. Both Rodríguez and Thiam tied at 1.95 metres which equaled the World Championship Heptathlon Best. Home favorite Katarina Johnson-Thompson was expected to be competitive, particularly in the high jump since she holds the British record, but she only made one clearance in the competition, at 1.80 metres, significantly below her personal best of 1.98 metres. Thiam separated from Rodríguez with a shot put 1.72 metres better. Carolin Schäfer was the next closest challenger after her personal best in the shot. Thiam's normally weak 200 metres was consistent, 24.57 is only 0.17 seconds off her personal best but it opened the door for Schäfer to be the overall leader after day one. Johnson-Thompson's 22.78 roared her back into contention in fourth place.

At the beginning of the second day, Johnson-Thompson produced a 6.56 metre long jump to move up in the rankings. Rodríguez and Schäfer lost some ground with 6.23 metre and 6.20 metre jumps. On her final attempt, Thiam gained ground on all of them with her 6.57 metre best jump of the day. In the javelin throw, Thiam and Schäfer were about even through the first two throws, with Rodríguez losing about two metres to both of them and Johnson-Thompson falling well behind. On the final throw, Schäfer edged a few centimetres past Thiam's earlier throw, but Thiam unleashed a 53.93 metre throw to pad her lead by another 76 points. But the best javelin throw of the day was a World Championship Heptathlon Best 58.41 metres by Anouk Vetter, which brought her into the medal chase, displacing Rodríguez. Going into the final event, Vetter and Schäfer were virtually tied with only 3 points separation. They knew their performance in the 800 metres would determine which medal they got. With 170 points to spare, it would take a weak 800 metres by Thiam to allow either a shot at gold. Schäfer's 800 metres record was about 3 seconds faster than Vetter coming in, and needing her best Schäfer managed at 2:15.34 while Vetter visibly struggled to a 2:19.43. While Thiam's 800 metres was the third from the bottom, it was still adequate for an easy overall win.

Records
Before the competition records were as follows:

The following records were set at the competition:

Qualification standard
The standard to qualify automatically for entry was 6200 points.

Schedule
The event schedule, in local time (UTC+1), was as follows:

Results

100 metres hurdles
The 100 metres hurdles took place on 5 August in four heats as follows:

The overall results were as follows:

High jump
The high jump took place on 5 August in two groups with Group A starting at 11:29 and Group B starting at 11:30. The results were as follows:

Shot put
The shot put took place on 5 August in two groups with Group A starting at 18:59 and Group B starting at 19:00. The results were as follows:

200 metres
The 200 metres took place on 5 August in four heats as follows:

The overall results were as follows:

Long jump
The long jump took place on 6 August in two groups with Group A starting at 09:59 and Group B starting at 10:00. The results were as follows:

Javelin throw
The javelin throw took place on 6 August in two groups with Group A starting at 11:54 and Group B starting at 13:07. The results were as follows:

800 metres

The 800 metres took place on 6 August in three heats as follows:

The overall results were as follows:

Final standings
The final standing were as follows:

References

Decathlon
Heptathlon at the World Athletics Championships